Wick was a ward in the London Borough of Hackney that formed part of the Hackney South and Shoreditch constituency. It fully covered the area of Hackney Wick and includes the part of the 2012 Summer Olympics and Paralympics being built in the Borough.

The ward returned three councillors to Borough Council, with an election every four years. At the previous local election on 6 May 2010 Antoinette Bramble, Chris Kennedy, and Jessica Webb, all Labour Party candidates, were returned. Turnout was 54%; with 4,324 votes cast.

Wick ward had a total population of 11,027, increasing to 11,734 at the 2011 Census.  This compares with the average ward population within the borough of 10,674.

References

External links
 London Borough of Hackney list of constituencies and councillors.
 Labour Party profile of Chris Kennedy
 Labour Party profile of Jessica Webb

Wards of the London Borough of Hackney
2014 disestablishments in England
1965 establishments in England
Hackney Wick